The Louisville Railway Company (LRC) was a streetcar and interurban rail operator in Louisville, Kentucky. It began under the name Louisville City Railway in 1859 as a horsecar operator and slowly acquired other rival companies. It was renamed in 1880 following the  merger of all Mule operations as the Louisville Railway Company. All tracks were  gauge.

Timeline

1889 - First electric streetcar line in Louisville opened on Green St., now Liberty St.
 
1901 - Electrification of streetcar lines completed 1901. The Crescent Hill Mule Car Line the systems last.

1901 - Louisville & Eastern Railroad opens first interurban railway in area, extending northeast to Crestwood.

1904 - Louisville & Interurban Railroad opens its first interurban line, east to Jeffersontown. Louisville & Interurban Railroad was owned by Louisville Traction Co., a holding company which also owned Louisville Railway Co.

1904 - Line also opened northeast to Prospect, by electrifying a Louisville & Nashville steam railroad branch former Louisville Harrods Creek and Westport Railway. This would be the only  interurban line in the Louisville area, with broad gauge on all other electric railways in area.

1905 - Louisville & Interurban Railroad opens interurban line southeast to Okolona.

1907 - Louisville & Eastern Railroad completes interurban line beyond Crestwood to La Grange. Louisville & Interurban Railroad opens interurban line southwest to Orell.

1908 - Louisville & Interurban Railroad opens interurban line southeast to Fern Creek.

1910 - Louisville & Eastern Railroad opens interurban line east to Shelbyville.

1911 - Louisville & Interurban Railroad acquires Louisville & Eastern Railroad.

1923 - Louisville Railway Co. forms subsidiary Kentucky Carriers Inc., which operates first bus route in Louisville on 3rd St. This route was not successful, and would be discontinued within a few months. Additional bus routes were created that year, which would be more successful.

1927 - People's Transit Co. begins operating bus route on Broadway in competition with streetcars, but is soon ordered to cease operating. Additional new bus routes created, operated directly by Louisville Railway Co. In addition, Virgil Pierce begins operating bus route on Preston St. to Camp Taylor, competing with interurban railway route which operated south to Okolona.

1928 - Kentucky Carriers bus routes transferred to Louisville Railway Co., with Kentucky Carriers subsidiary remaining only as a charter bus operator.

1931 - Interurban line to Okolona abandoned, with Virgil Pierce bus route remaining to provide local service.

1932 - Interurban line to Jeffersontown abandoned. Blue Motor Coach Co. formed, providing replacement bus service.

1933 - Interurban line to Fern Creek abandoned, replaced with bus service operated by Blue Motor Coach Co. Bus service operated into downtown Louisville, not carrying local passengers within city.

1934 - Interurban line to Shelbyville abandoned, with no direct bus replacement. Southeastern Greyhound Lines already provided service along this route, on its route between Louisville and Lexington.

1935 - Interurban line to La Grange abandoned, replacement bus service operated by Chaudoin Bus Lines. Interurban line to Prospect abandoned, replaced with Paxton Bus Line route. After World War II, Paxton Bus Line would be succeeded by Goebel's Bus Line, and later Prospect Bus Line. Interurban line to Orell also abandoned, replaced with Louisville Railway Co. bus route. Virgil Pierce bus line sold to Blue Motor Coach Co.

1936 - Walnut becomes first trolleybus route in Louisville.

1938 - Newberg Bus Line begins operation, serving Newberg and Buechel areas southeast of downtown Louisville. The line would later be sold to Buechel Bus Co., which would later extend service to General Electric's appliance factory, completed in 1951.

1945 - Chaudoin Bus Lines sold to Kentucky Bus Lines.

1948 - Last streetcars replaced with buses Louisville Railway ended all streetcar service on the 4th Avenue Queen Loop route Derby Day

1948 - Blue Motor Coach Co. introduces service between Louisville and Middletown, over objections of Southeastern Greyhound Lines, already serving Middletown along its route between Louisville and Lexington.

1951 - its trolley buses ceased service on Market Street, Walnut and Fourth Street following the expiration of a power agreement with Louisville Gas and Electric and Louisville Railway Company..

1951 - Louisville Railway Co. sold to Louisville Transit Co. Blue Motor Coach Co. discontinues Middletown bus route after a court battle, leaving Southeastern Greyhound Lines as the only provider of service along this route.

1953 - Louisville Transit Co. assumes Middletown service from Southeastern Greyhound Lines, after service proved to be inadequate and unprofitable for Greyhound. The Middletown route was formed by extending its St. Matthews Express bus route.

1958 - Louisville Transit Co. acquires Buechel Bus Co.

1972 - Louisville Transit Co. acquires Kentucky Bus Lines routes.

1974 - Louisville Transit Co. becomes publicly owned Transit Authority of River City. Discontinues service to Lagrange and Shepherdsville

1976 - Transit Authority of River City acquires Blue Motor Coach Co.

1977 - Transit Authority of River City acquires Prospect Bus Line.

2014 - Louisville Railway Company reformed as a non profit to promote restoration of  Market Street Streetcar Service

Fleet
100 Kuhlman Car Company 1929 Master Unit
200 St Louis Car Company 1929 Master Unit
250 Cincinnati Car Co 1929 Master Unit
345-354 Louisville Railway Company 1912
355-368 Kuhlman Car Company  1924
401-477 Brill Car Company 1922 Birney
500-537 Cincinnati Car 1922 Birney
551-553 Brill Car Co 1879
700-723 St Louis Car 1900
770-784 Kuhlman Car Company
800-889 St Louis Car 1902
930-935 St Louis Car Company 1905
936-945 St Louis Car Company 1905
980-1049 St Louis Car Company 1905
1050-1112 Cincinnati Car Company 1910

Twenty-five PCC cars numbered 501-525 were ordered from the St. Louis Car Company in 1946 but the order was cancelled before delivery was completed. The Louisville-bound cars were instead sold to the Cleveland Transit System where they became numbers 4250-4274. Car 509 / 4259 was acquired in 1952 by the Toronto Transit Commission (as part of an order of 50 Pullman PCC A11 and 25 St. Louis Car Company A12 cars) and renumbered as 4684; it has since been retired and now owned by Halton County Radial Railway.

See also 
 Louisville and Interurban Railroad

References 

Defunct companies based in Louisville, Kentucky
Transportation in Louisville, Kentucky
Defunct Kentucky railroads
Defunct public transport operators in the United States
Railway companies established in 1859
1951 disestablishments in Kentucky
5 ft gauge railways in the United States
1859 establishments in Kentucky
Railway companies disestablished in 1951